Melina Matsoukas (born January 14, 1981) is an American music video, film, commercial and television director.  She is a two-time Grammy Award winner and four-time MTV Video Music Awards winner for her "We Found Love" and "Formation" music videos. She was honored with the Franklin J. Schaffner Alumni Medal by the American Film Institute in 2019. Her directorial debut in film was Queen & Slim, starring Jodie Turner-Smith and Daniel Kaluuya, and written by Lena Waithe. She then worked as executive producer and director for television series Insecure, being nominated for the Primetime Emmy Award for Outstanding Comedy Series in 2020.

Early life and education
Matsoukas grew up in the Co-op City housing development in the Bronx. Her father worked as a builder, and her mother taught math in a local high school. When Matsoukas was eight, the family moved to Hackensack, New Jersey, where she attended Hackensack High School. Her father is of mixed Greek and Jewish descent, and her mother is of Afro-Cuban and Afro-Jamaican descent.

Matsoukas earned her degree at New York University's Tisch School of the Arts and completed her graduate work at the AFI Conservatory with an MFA in cinematography. Her graduate thesis was on music videos.

Career
Matsoukas started out at Black Dog Film, then the now-defunct Gorilla Flix film production company, and is currently a director at Prettybird, which she has been signed to since 2011.

Matsoukas' first film was about how women are viewed in the New York meatpacking industry, though she immediately destroyed it upon completion, describing it as "a really bad film" that "made her fall in love with the medium". In 2006, Matsoukas directed her first music video upon completing grad school in 2006 for Red Handed's "Dem Girls " featuring Scooby and Paul Wall. She would later direct videos for artists such as Jennifer Lopez, Ludacris, Lady Gaga, Katy Perry, Rihanna, Solange, and eventually her most frequent collaborator, Beyonce. In 2016, Matsoukas contributed to Beyonce's visual album Lemonade with a music video for the album's lead single "Formation ". "Formation" went on to be critically acclaimed, winning Matsoukas numerous accolades such as a Grand Prix for Excellence in Music Video at the 2016 Cannes Lion Awards as well as the MTV Video Music Award for Video of the Year.

In her music video filmography, Matsoukas would utilize many of the tropes seen in other music videos at the time, but would find ways to "always articulates her aesthetic: brightly saturated color, vivid imagery, the artist at the center of the frame always establishing a video's center of gravity". Her work is described as "chock full of bright colors or crisp black and white images, smooth spotlights, and tasteful retro video models." Matsoukas says that expensive equipment is not necessary for a quality video and one should never think that way: "A good video has the right visuals, a well conceptualised story and should be exciting and elicit reaction." In an interview for Venus Zines Fall 2010 issue, she explains about being part of the music video world, "I love it. The quick turnaround, the creativity."

Between 2016 and 2017, Matsoukas became the executive producer and director of several episodes of the critically and publicly acclaimed television series Master of None and Insecure including the acclaimed episode from Master of None "Thanksgiving", which would go on to win several Emmy Awards, though Matsoukas herself would not be nominated for any awards for her work on the program. She was later nominated for Outstanding Comedy Series at the 72nd Primetime Emmy Awards. Matsoukas also was nominated for two NAACP Image Awards for Outstanding Directing in a Comedy Series and the Directors Guild of America Awards for Outstanding Directorial Achievement in Comedy Series.

Matsoukas made her directorial debut in film with Queen & Slim, starring Jodie Turner-Smith and Daniel Kaluuya, and written by Lena Waithe. It was released on November 27, 2019, by Universal Pictures. Though Matsoukas avoids making professional decisions based on personal relationships, she was intrigued by the opportunity to direct the script written by her past collaborator and good friend, Lena Waithe, later stating that she "was looking for something [she] felt was political in a way that had something to say, that was strong and unique and powerful." Queen & Slim was well received critically and financially, and grossed $47.9 million worldwide. Matsoukas won a Black Reel Awards, a BET Award, a National Board of Review Awards and was nominated for the Directors Guild of America Awards for Outstanding Directing - First Time Feature Film.

In 2019, Matsoukas was honored with the Franklin J. Schaffner Alumni Medal by the American Film Institute, and was named to the Ebony Power 100 List in 2020. In 2020 she directed the commercial spot Beats by Dre: You Love Me, being recognized with the Directors Guild of America Awards for Outstanding Directorial Achievement in Commercials.

Filmography (director)

Music videos

Commercials

Television

Film

Awards and nominations

References

External links
Melina Matsoukas at Prettybird

Melina Matsoukas at Music Video Database
Melina Matsoukas at Clipland

1981 births
AFI Conservatory alumni
American music video directors
American people of Cuban descent
American people of Greek descent
American people of Jamaican descent
American people of Jewish descent
Female music video directors
African-American film directors
African-American Jews
Grammy Award winners
Hackensack High School alumni
Living people
People from Hackensack, New Jersey
Place of birth missing (living people)
Tisch School of the Arts alumni